Jerry Gordon Sturm (December 31, 1936 – June 17, 2020) was an American professional gridiron football player.  He played college football at the University of Illinois at Urbana–Champaign.  He played professionally in Canadian Football League (CFL) for the Saskatchewan Roughriders (1958), and Calgary Stampeders (1959–1960), the American Football League (AFL) for the Denver Broncos (1961–1966), and in the National Football League (NFL) for the New Orleans Saints (1967–1970), Houston Oilers (1971), and Philadelphia Eagles (1972).  He was an American Football League All-Star in 1964 and 1966.

After retiring from football, Sturm owned "The South" restaurant along with his wife, Debbie, in Englewood, Colorado. The restaurant offers a selection of Mexican and American food.

Sturm died on June 17, 2020. He had been suffering dementia prior to his death. His family announced that they would donate Sturm's brain to the Concussion Legacy Foundation at Boston University to study the effects of brain trauma from Sturm's football career.

See also
 List of American Football League players

References

1936 births
2020 deaths
American football centers
American football offensive guards
American football offensive tackles
Canadian football offensive linemen
American players of Canadian football
Calgary Stampeders players
Denver Broncos (AFL) players
Illinois Fighting Illini football players
Houston Oilers players
New Orleans Saints players
Philadelphia Eagles players
Saskatchewan Roughriders players
American Football League All-Star players
People from English, Indiana
Sportspeople from Terre Haute, Indiana
Players of American football from Indiana